Bottom line is the income that an company has after subtracting costs and expenses from the total revenue. When a lot of potential working capital is trapped in disputes, your company will be at risk of a decreasing bottom line.

Bottom line or the bottom line may also refer to:

Arts, media and entertainment
 The Bottom Line (radio programme), a business discussion programme on BBC Radio 4
 The Bottom Line (Australian TV series), an Australian leadership discussion television program on Channel Nine
 The Bottom Line (media), a Slovenian online investigative media website
 ESPN BottomLine, ESPN's lower third sports information ticker
 The Bottom Line, US politics discussion program by Al Jazeera English
 The Bottomline with Boy Abunda, a talk show program in the Philippines on ABS-CBN
 "Bottom line", the catchphrase of wrestler Stone Cold Steve Austin
 WWE Bottom Line, a World Wrestling Entertainment syndicated television show

Music
 Bottom Line (album), a 1979 album by John Mayall
 The Bottom Line (Bryant University), a collegiate a cappella group at Bryant University

Songs
 "Bottom Line", by Diana Ross from her 1989 album Workin' Overtime
 "Bottom Line", by Martin Solveig from his 2008 album C'est La Vie
 "Bottom Line", by Ratt from their 1988 album Reach for the Sky
 "Bottom Line", by Raven from their 1985 album Stay Hard
 "Bottom Line", by Swollen Members from their 2003 album Heavy
 "Bottom Line", by the 77s from their 1987 album The 77s
 "The Bottom Line", by Alanis Morissette, a demo for 1995's Jagged Little Pill
 "The Bottom Line", by Big Audio Dynamite from their 1985 debut This Is Big Audio Dynamite
 "The Bottom Line", by David Lee Roth from his 1988 album Skyscraper
 "The Bottom Line", by Depeche Mode from their 1997 album Ultra

Other uses
 Bottom Line Inc., an American publisher of books, newsletters and web articles
 The Bottom Line (venue), a performance venue in New York City's Greenwich Village from 1974 to 2004
 Bottom line, the "tail-female" line of descent (traced only through females), reflecting that line's position at the bottom of tabulated pedigrees in horse breeding

See also
 Bottom line mentality, in psychology
 "Land of the Bottom Line", by John Gorka from his 1990 album Land of the Bottom Line
 Double bottom line, a business term used in socially responsible enterprise and investment
 Triple bottom line, a business term used in measuring organizational (and societal) success: economic, environmental and social
 BLUF (communication) (bottom line up front)